Thomas Jeffery Flynn (born March 24, 1962 in Verona, Pennsylvania) is a former American football safety who played five seasons in the National Football League.  He played college football at the University of Pittsburgh and was drafted by the Green Bay Packers in the fifth round of the 1984 NFL Draft. In his rookie season he led the NFC in interceptions with nine, and was voted Pro Football Weekly's NFL Defensive Rookie of the Year. He was unexpectedly cut by the Packers early in the 1986 season, but was signed by the New York Giants soon after. He is remembered by the Giants for his big play in the last game of the 1986 season, against the Packers, where he exacted revenge on his old team by blocking a punt and returning it for a touchdown.

Flynn now resides in Murrysville, Pennsylvania with his wife and four children: Zach, Jake, Jillian, and Zane.

References

External links
NFL.com

1962 births
Living people
People from Verona, Pennsylvania
American football safeties
Players of American football from Pennsylvania
Pittsburgh Panthers football players
Green Bay Packers players
New York Giants players